This is a list of Boeing B-29 Superfortress units consisting of nations, their air forces, and the unit assignments that used the B-29 during World War II, Korean War, and post war periods, including variants and other historical information

Delivery of the first YB-29 test aircraft (YB-29-BW 41-36954) to the USAAF was made in June 1943, being delivered to the 58th Bombardment Wing, 40th Bombardment Group. The first production B-29s began to roll off the production lines at Boeing-Wichita in September 1943, also going to the 58th BW.

The last B-29 was delivered by Boeing-Wichita (B-29-100-BW, 45-21872) in September 1945. 21872 was converted to a WB-29; being destroyed in a crash on 25 September 1953 near Eielson AFB, Alaska, when assigned to the 58th Strategic Reconnaissance Squadron (Medium), Weather.

United States

United States Army Air Forces

Combat Groups
Army Air Forces B-29 groups and squadrons assigned to operations as part of the Pacific War against the Japanese Empire, 1944–1945.   Includes units assigned to the XX Bomber Command in the China-Burma-India Theater (April 1944 – February 1945), and to XXI Bomber Command in the Pacific Theater of Operations (PTO) (March–August 1945).  Also includes groups and squadrons deployed to Okinawa assigned to Eighth Air Force, in July/August 1945 but did not engage in combat operations.

 6th Bombardment Group, (B-29, B-29A, 1944–1947)
 Reassigned from Sixth Air Force (ATO)
 Redesignated Very Heavy BG, March 1944
 XXI BC; 313th Bombardment Wing
 Circle R Tail Code; North Field, Tinian
 24th Bombardment Squadron
 39th Bombardment Squadron
 40th Bombardment Squadron
 Inactivated in October 1948

 9th Bombardment Group, (B-29, B-29A, 1944–1947)
 Reassigned from Sixth Air Force (ATO)
 Redesignated Very Heavy BG, March 1944
 XXI BC; 313th Bombardment Wing
 Circle X Tail Code; North Field, Tinian
 1st Bombardment Squadron
 5th Bombardment Squadron
 99th Bombardment Squadron
 Inactivated in October 1948

 16th Bombardment Group, (B-29B, 1944–1946)
 Activated, April 1944
 XXI BC; 315th Bombardment Wing
 Diamond B Tail Code; Northwest Field, Guam
 15th Bombardment Squadron
 16th Bombardment Squadron
 17th Bombardment Squadron
 Inactivated in April 1946

 19th Bombardment Group, (B-29, B-29A, 1944–1954)
 Reassigned from Fifth Air Force (SWPA)
 Redesignated Very Heavy BG, April 1944
 XXI BC; 314th Bombardment Wing
 Square M Tail Code; North Field, Guam
 28th Bombardment Squadron
 30th Bombardment Squadron
 93d Bombardment Squadron
 Reassigned to: Twentieth Air Force (FEAF), May 1946
 Reassigned to: 19th Bombardment Wing (FEAF), August 1948
 Moved to: Andersen AFB, Guam, August 1948
 Moved to: Kadena AB, Okinawa, June 1950
 Combat in Korean War, 1950–1953
 Reassigned to: Strategic Air Command in June 1954

 29th Bombardment Group, (B-29, B-29A, 1944–1946)
 Reassigned from II Bomber Command (ZI)
 Redesignated Very Heavy BG, April 1944
 XXI BC; 314th Bombardment Wing
 Square O Tail Code; North Field, Guam
 6th Bombardment Squadron
 43d Bombardment Squadron
 52d Bombardment Squadron
 Inactivated in May 1946

 39th Bombardment Group, (B-29, B-29A, 1944–1945)
 Reassigned from II Bomber Command (ZI)
 Redesignated Very Heavy BG, April 1944
 XXI BC; 314th Bombardment Wing
 Square P Tail Code; North Field, Guam
 60th Bombardment Squadron
 61st Bombardment Squadron
 62d Bombardment Squadron
 Inactivated in December 1945

 40th Bombardment Group, (B-29, B-29A, 1943–1946)
 Reassigned from Sixth Air Force  (ATO)
 Redesignated Very Heavy BG, November 1943
 Redesignated Very Heavy BG, April 1944
 XX BC; XXI BC; 58th Bombardment Wing
 Chakulia, India, Hsingching, China (XX BC); West Field, Tinian (XXI BC)
 Triangle S Tail Code
 25th Bombardment Squadron
 44th Bombardment Squadron
 45th Bombardment Squadron
 Inactivated in October 1946

 330th Bombardment Group (VH), (B-29, B-29A, 1944–1945)
 Reassigned from II Bomber Command (ZI)
 Redesignated Very Heavy BG, April 1944
 XXI BC; 314th Bombardment Wing
 Square K Tail Code; North Field, Guam
 457th Bombardment Squadron
 458th Bombardment Squadron
 459th Bombardment Squadron
 Inactivated in November 1945

 331st Bombardment Group, (B-29B, 1944–1946)
 Reassigned from II Bomber Command (ZI)
 Redesignated Very Heavy BG, July 1944
 XXI BC; 315th Bombardment Wing
 Diamond L Tail Code; Northwest Field, Guam
 355th Bombardment Squadron
 356th Bombardment Squadron
 357th Bombardment Squadron
 Inactivated in April 1946

 333d Bombardment Group, (B-29, 1944–1946)
 Reassigned from II Bomber Command (ZI)
 Redesignated Very Heavy BG, July 1944
 Eighth Air Force; 316th Bombardment Wing
 Kadena Field, Okinawa
 435th Bombardment Squadron
 460th Bombardment Squadron
 507th Bombardment Squadron
 Inactivated in May 1946

 346th Bombardment Group, (B-29, 1944–1946)
 Reassigned from II Bomber Command (ZI)
 Redesignated Very Heavy BG, August 1944
 Eighth Air Force; 316th Bombardment Wing
 Kadena Field, Okinawa
 461st Bombardment Squadron
 462d Bombardment Squadron
 463d Bombardment Squadron
 Inactivated in June 1946

 382d Bombardment Group, (B-29, 1944–1946)
 Reassigned from II Bomber Command (ZI)
 Redesignated Very Heavy BG, August 1944
 Eighth Air Force; 316th Bombardment Wing
 Kadena Field, Okinawa
 420th Bombardment Squadron
 464th Bombardment Squadron
 872d Bombardment Squadron
 Inactivated in January 1946

 383d Bombardment Group, (B-29, 1944–1946)
 Reassigned from II Bomber Command (ZI)
 Redesignated Very Heavy BG, August 1944
 Eighth Air Force; 316th Bombardment Wing
 Kadena Field, Okinawa
 876th Bombardment Squadron
 880th Bombardment Squadron
 884th Bombardment Squadron
 Inactivated in January 1946

 444th Bombardment Group, (B-29, 1944–1946)
 Reassigned from II Bomber Command (ZI)
 Redesignated Very Heavy BG, August 1944
 XX BC; XXI BC; 58th Bombardment Wing
 Dudkhuadi, India, Kwanghan, China (XX BC); West Field, Tinian (XXI BC)
 Triangle N Tail Code
 676th Bombardment Squadron
 677th Bombardment Squadron
 678th Bombardment Squadron
 679th Bombardment Squadron (1943–1944)
 Inactivated in August 1946

 462d Bombardment Group, (B-29, B-29A, 1943–1946)
 Activated, July 1943
 Redesignated Very Heavy BG, November 1943
 XX BC; XXI BC; 58th Bombardment Wing
 Piardpba, India, Kiunglai, China (XX BC); West Field, Tinian (XXI BC)
 Triangle U Tail Code
 768th Bombardment Squadron
 769th Bombardment Squadron
 770th Bombardment Squadron
 771st Bombardment Squadron  (1943–1944)
 Inactivated in March 1946

 468th Bombardment Group, (B-29, B-29A, 1943–1946)
 Activated, August 1943
 Redesignated Very Heavy BG, November 1943
 XX BC; XXI BC; 58th Bombardment Wing
 Kharagpur, India, Pengshan, China (XX BC); West Field, Tinian (XXI BC)
 Triangle I Tail Code
 792d Bombardment Squadron
 793d Bombardment Squadron
 794th Bombardment Squadron
 795th Bombardment Squadron  (1943–1944)
 Inactivated in March 1946

 497th Bombardment Group, (B-29, B-29A, 1943–1946)
 Activated, November 1943
 XXI BC; 73rd Bombardment Wing
 A Square Tail Code; Isley Field, Saipan
 869th Bombardment Squadron
 870th Bombardment Squadron
 871st Bombardment Squadron
 Inactivated in March 1946

 498th Bombardment Group, (B-29, B-29A, 1943–1946)
 Activated, November 1943
 XXI BC; 73rd Bombardment Wing
 T Square Tail Code; Isley Field, Saipan
 873d Bombardment Squadron
 874th Bombardment Squadron
 875th Bombardment Squadron
 Inactivated in August 1946

 499th Bombardment Group, (B-29, 1943–1946)
 Activated, November 1943
 XXI BC; 73rd Bombardment Wing
 V Square Tail Code; Isley Field, Saipan
 877th Bombardment Squadron
 878th Bombardment Squadron
 879th Bombardment Squadron
 Inactivated in February 1946

 500th Bombardment Group, (B-29, B-29A, 1943–1946)
 Activated, November 1943
 XXI BC; 73rd Bombardment Wing
 Z Square Tail Code; Isley Field, Saipan
 881st Bombardment Squadron
 882d Bombardment Squadron
 883d Bombardment Squadron
 Inactivated in January 1946

 501st Bombardment Group, (B-29B, 1944–1946)
 Activated, May 1944
 XXI BC; 315th Bombardment Wing
 Diamond Y Tail Code; Northwest Field, Guam
 21st Bombardment Squadron
 41st Bombardment Squadron
 485th Bombardment Squadron
 Inactivated in June 1946

 502d Bombardment Group, (B-29B, 1944–1946)
 Activated, May 1944
 XXI BC; 315th Bombardment Wing
 Diamond H Tail Code; Northwest Field, Guam
 402d Bombardment Squadron
 411th Bombardment Squadron
 430th Bombardment Squadron
 Inactivated in April 1946

 504th Bombardment Group, (B-29, B-29A, 1944–1946)
 Activated, March 1944
 XXI BC; 313th Bombardment Wing
 Circle E Tail Code; North Field, Tinian
 398th Bombardment Squadron
 421st Bombardment Squadron
 680th Bombardment Squadron
 Inactivated in June 1946

 505th Bombardment Group, (B-29, B-29A, 1944–1946)
 Activated, March 1944
 XXI BC; 313th Bombardment Wing
 Circle W Tail Code; North Field, Tinian
 482d Bombardment Squadron
 483d Bombardment Squadron
 484th Bombardment Squadron
 Inactivated in June 1946

 509th Composite Group, (B-29, 1944; Silverplate B-29, 1945–1947)
 Activated, December 1944
 XXI BC; 315th Bombardment Wing
 Various Tail Codes; North Field, Tinian
 393d Bombardment Squadron
 Redesignated: 509th Bombardment Group, July 1946
 Became part of Strategic Air Command; assigned to 509th Bombardment Wing in November 1947.

Combat Reconnaissance Squadrons
 1st Photographic Reconnaissance Squadron, (F-13A, 1944–1947)
 3d Photographic Reconnaissance Squadron, (F-13A, 1944–1947)

Non-Combat Groups
Army Air Forces groups which were assigned to Second Air Force for conversion B-29 training during the summer of 1945. These groups were returned to the United States from the European Theater of Operations (ETO) after the German Capitulation in May 1945, and were programmed to redeploy to the Pacific Theater of Operations (PTO) after their training was completed.   However, the Japanese Capitulation and the end of combat in the PTO led to their inactivation after August 1945.

 98th Bombardment Group
 Reassigned from Twelfth Air Force (MTO)
 Redesignated Very Heavy BG, July 1945
 343d Bombardment Squadron
 344th Bombardment Squadron
 345th Bombardment Squadron
 Inactivated in November 1945

 450th Bombardment Group
 Reassigned from Fifteenth Air Force (MTO)
 Redesignated Very Heavy BG, July 1945
 720th Bombardment Squadron
 721st Bombardment Squadron
 722d Bombardment Squadron
 723d Bombardment Squadron
 Inactivated in October 1945

 466th Bombardment Group
 Reassigned from Eighth Air Force (ETO)
 Redesignated Very Heavy BG, August 1945
 784th Bombardment Squadron
 785th Bombardment Squadron
 786th Bombardment Squadron
 787th Bombardment Squadron
 Inactivated in October 1945

 489th Bombardment Group
 Reassigned from Eighth Air Force (ETO)
 Redesignated Very Heavy BG, March 1945
 844th Bombardment Squadron
 845th Bombardment Squadron
 846th Bombardment Squadron
 847th Bombardment Squadron
 Inactivated in October 1945

 472d Bombardment Group (2d AF Operational Training Unit)*
 Activated in September 1943
 808th Bombardment Squadron
 809th Bombardment Squadron
 810th Bombardment Squadron
 811th Bombardment Squadron
 Inactivated in April 1944

 32d Composite Wing* (Twentieth Air Force)
 Activated in August 1948 (RB-29, 1948–1949)
 31st Strategic Reconnaissance Squadron
 Inactivated in April 1949

 5th Bombardment (later Reconnaissance) Group (Thirteenth Air Force)*
 Redesignated Very Heavy BG, Apr 1946 (B-29)
 Redesignated Reconnaissance Group, Mar 1947 (F-13A, later RB-29)
 5th Reconnaissance Squadron
 23d Bombardment (later Reconnaissance) Squadron
 31st Bombardment (later Reconnaissance) Squadron
 38th Reconnaissance Squadron
 338th Reconnaissance Squadron
 394th Bombardment Squadron
 Assigned to: Strategic Air Command, May 1949
 Assigned to: 5th Strategic Reconnaissance Wing, July 1949

.* Note: The 472d Bombardment Group was a Second Air Force Operational Training Unit for initial B-29 crew training established in 1943; the 5th Bombardment Group was redesignated and reequipped as a B-29 unit by Far East Air Forces and assigned to Thirteenth Air Force in the Philippines in 1946 from aircraft and equipment of former XXI Bomber Command units which had inactivated.  The 5th BG was a prewar bomb group assigned to Hawaii at the time of the Pearl Harbor Attack; its B-17s largely destroyed on the ground at Hickam Field.   The unit was reformed into a B-24 Liberator heavy bomb group after the attack and was assigned to Thirteenth AF during the war; the 32d Composite Wing flew RB-29s for Far East Air Forces in the late 1940s, primarily as photo-mapping aircraft over China, Formosa, Indochina and Korea.

Strategic Air Command (Groups)
Army Air Forces B-29 bomb groups assigned to Strategic Air Command (SAC) after the command's establishment in March 1946.  Includes groups that were returned to the United States from the European Theater and were programmed to redeploy to the Pacific Theater of Operations (PTO) after their B-29 conversion training was completed.  These units were retained on active service after the Japanese Capitulation in August 1945 and were assigned to Continental Air Forces (CAF).  In March 1946 were transferred to SAC upon redesignation of CAF to SAC.

Many of these units and squadrons were under-manned and under-equipped due to the rapid demobilization of the armed forces in this period.  In addition, frequent inactivations and activations were made, with older, prewar units being reactivated in place of younger, wartime units. Up until the end of the Korean War, SAC used tail markings that consisted of a combination of geometric shapes and letters.  The shape would indicate the Numbered Air Force, with a triangle representing the Eighth Air Force; a circle for Fifteenth Air Force and a square for Second Air Force.  This system was phased out in 1953.

 2d Bombardment Group, (B-29, 1947–1948)
 Activated in July 1947
 Chatam AFB, Georgia
 Tail Code: Empty Square
 20th Bombardment Squadron
 49th Bombardment Squadron
 96th Bombardment Squadron
 Re-equipped with B-50 Superfortress, July 1948

 7th Bombardment Group, (B-29, 1946–1948)
 Activated in October 1946
 Carswell AFB, Texas
 Tail Code: Empty Triangle
 9th Bombardment Squadron
 436th Bombardment Squadron
 492d Bombardment Squadron
 Re-equipped with B-36 Peacemaker, July 1948

 22d Bombardment Group, (B-29, 1948–1952)
 Reassigned from Fifth Air Force (WPA)
 Redesignated Very Heavy BG, June 1946
 March AFB, California
 Tail Code: Circle-E
 2d Bombardment Squadron
 19th Bombardment Squadron
 33d Bombardment Squadron
 Group assigned to 22d Bombardment Wing, June 1952

 28th Bombardment Group, (B-29, 1946–1950)
 Activated in July 1946 from a/p/e of inactivated 449th Bombardment Group
 Ellsworth AFB, South Dakota
 Tail Code: Triangle-S
 77th Bombardment Squadron
 717th Bombardment Squadron
 718th Bombardment Squadron
 Re-equipped with RB-29 Superfortress, April 1950
 Re-equipped with B-36 Peacemaker, July 1950

 43d Bombardment Group, (B-29, 1946–1948)
 Activated in October 1946 from a/p/e of inactivated 444th Bombardment Group
 Davis-Monthan AFB, Arizona
 Tail Code: Circle-K
 63d Bombardment Squadron
 64th Bombardment Squadron
 65th Bombardment Squadron
 Re-equipped with B-50 Superfortress, July 1948

 92d Bombardment Group, (B-29, 1946–1952)
 Reassigned from Eighth Air Force (ETO)
 Redesignated Very Heavy BG, July 1946
 Fairchild AFB, Washington
 Tail Code: Circle-W
 325th Bombardment Squadron
 326th Bombardment Squadron
 327th Bombardment Squadron
 Group assigned to 92d Bombardment Wing, June 1952

 93d Bombardment Group, (B-29, 1947–1949)
 Reassigned from Eighth Air Force (ETO)
 Redesignated Very Heavy BG, July 1945
 Castle AFB, California
 Tail Code: Circle-M
 328th Bombardment Squadron
 329th Bombardment Squadron
 330th Bombardment Squadron
 Re-equipped with B-50 Superfortress, July 1949

 97th Bombardment Group, (B-29, 1946–1950)
 Activated in August 1946 from a/p/e of inactivated 485th Bombardment Group
 Eielson AFB, Alaska; Smoky Hill AFB, Kansas; Biggs AFB, Texas
 Tail Code: Triangle-O
 340th Bombardment Squadron
 341st Bombardment Squadron
 342d Bombardment Squadron
 Re-equipped with B-50 Superfortress, 1950 
 Re-equipped with B-47 Stratojet, 1955

 301st Bombardment Group, (B-29, 1946–1952)
 Activated in August 1946 from a/p/e of inactivated 467th Bombardment Group
 Smoky Hill AFB, Kansas
 Tail Code: Square-A
 32d Bombardment Squadron
 352d Bombardment Squadron
 353d Bombardment Squadron
 Group assigned to 301st Bombardment Wing, June 1952

 307th Bombardment Group, (B-29, 1947–1952)
 Activated in August 1946 from a/p/e of inactivated 498th Bombardment Group
 MacDill AFB, Florida; Yokota AB, Japan
 Tail Code: Square-Y
 370th Bombardment Squadron
 371st Bombardment Squadron
 372d Bombardment Squadron
 Group assigned to 307th Bombardment Wing, June 1952

 448th Bombardment Group, (B-29, 1945–1946)
 Reassigned from Eighth Air Force (ETO)
 Redesignated Very Heavy BG, August 1945
 Fort Worth Army Airfield, Texas
 Tail Code: Triangle-N
 712th Bombardment Squadron
 713th Bombardment Squadron
 714th Bombardment Squadron
 715th Bombardment Squadron
 Inactivated August 1946

 449th Bombardment Group, (B-29, 1945–1946)
 Reassigned from Fifteenth Air Force (MTO)
 Redesignated Very Heavy BG, May 1945
 Fort Worth Army Airfield, Texas
 716th Bombardment Squadron
 717th Bombardment Squadron
 718th Bombardment Squadron
 Inactivated August 1946, Aircraft Reassigned to 28th Bombardment Group

 458th Bombardment Group, (B-29, 1945–1946)
 Reassigned from Eighth Air Force (ETO)
 Redesignated Very Heavy BG, August 1945
 March Field, California
 752d Bombardment Squadron
 753d Bombardment Squadron
 754th Bombardment Squadron
 755th Bombardment Squadron
 Inactivated in July 1946

 485th Bombardment Group, (B-29, 1945–1946)
 Reassigned from Fifteenth Air Force (MTO)
 Redesignated Very Heavy BG, August 1945
 Smoky Hill Army Airfield, Kansas
 506th Bombardment Squadron
 828th Bombardment Squadron
 829th Bombardment Squadron
 830th Bombardment Squadron
 Inactivated August 1946

 509th Bombardment Group
 See Combat Groups Section

SAC Reconnaissance Squadrons

 9th Reconnaissance Squadron (Very Long Range), (F-13A, 1949)
 Assigned to: 314th Composite Wing, 20 June 1946-20 October 1947
 16th Photographic Squadron, (F-13A 1947)
 Assigned to: 55th Reconnaissance Group, 1 June-16 December 1947

 31st Strategic Reconnaissance Squadron (Very Long Range), (F-13A, 1947–1948)
 Assigned to: 71st Reconnaissance Group
 46th/72d Reconnaissance Squadron (Very Long Range, Photographic), (F-13A, 1946–1947)
 Assigned to: Strategic Air Command, 1 May 1946-13 October 1947
 Attached entire time to: Yukon Sector, Alaskan Air Command

United States Air Force

Strategic Air Command (Wings)
The B-29 was the mainstay of Strategic Air Command after World War II until the Korean War.  B-29 "Very Heavy" bomber units were redesignated "Medium" with the introduction of the B-36 Peacemaker into the inventory in 1948, with some units transitioning to the B-36/RB-36 beginning in 1949.   The B-50 Superfortress, an advanced version of the B-29 was also introduced in 1949.

SAC deployed non nuclear-capable B-29 groups to Far East Air Forces in 1950 to conduct strategic bombardment missions over the skies of North Korea, however the aircraft was made obsolete by the development of Soviet jet-powered interceptors such as the MiG-15.  The B-29 soldiered on for a more few years in the strategic bombardment role, but by 1955 was replaced by the B-47 Stratojet medium bomber.

In 1950, conversions of B-29s to KB-29P aerial tankers began to reach SAC squadrons.  KB-29s were in service with SAC until being replaced by the KC-97 Stratofreighter (which was itself based on the B-29) by 1955.

 1st Fighter Wing, (B-29, 1949)
 March AFB, California
 Assigned to Headquarters 1st FW while attached to 22d Bombardment Wing

 5th Strategic Reconnaissance Wing (B-29, 1949; RB-29, 1949–1951; KB-29 1949–1951)
 Activated in July 1949
 Mountain Home AFB, Idaho
 Tail Code: Circle-X
 23d Strategic Reconnaissance Squadron
 31st Strategic Reconnaissance Squadron
 72d Strategic Reconnaissance Squadron
 Replaced by RB-36D Peacemaker in 1951

 6th Bombardment Wing (B-29, 1951–1952)
 Activated in January 1951
 Walker AFB, New Mexico
 Tail Code: Empty Triangle
 24th Bombardment Squadron
 39th Bombardment Squadron
 40th Bombardment Squadron
 6th Air Refueling Squadron (KB-29, 1951–1952)
 Replaced by B-36D Peacemaker in 1951

 9th Bombardment Wing (B-29, 1949–1954; RB-29, 1949–1951)
 Activated in May 1949
 Mountain Home AFB, Idaho
 Tail Code: Circle-R
 1st Bombardment Squadron
 5th Bombardment Squadron
 99th Bombardment Squadron
 9th Air Refueling Squadron (KB-29, 1953)
 Replaced by B-47 Stratojet in 1954

 22d Bombardment Wing (B-29, 1949–1954)
 Activated in July 1948
 Combat in Korean War, Jul–Oct 1950
 March AFB, California
 Tail Code: Circle-E
 2d Bombardment Squadron
 19th Bombardment Squadron
 33d Bombardment Squadron
 Replaced by B-47 Stratojet in 1954

 27th Strategic Fighter Wing
 Bergstrom AFB, Texas
 27th Air Refueling Squadron (KB-29, 1953–1957)

 40th Bombardment Wing (B-29, 1953)
 Activated in May 1952
 Shilling AFB, Kansas
 Tail Code: Triangle-S
 25th Bombardment Squadron
 44th Bombardment Squadron
 45th Bombardment Squadron
 Replaced by B-47 Stratojet in 1953

 44th Bombardment Wing (TB-29, 1951; B-29, 1951–1953)
 Activated in January 1951
 Lake Charles AFB, Louisiana
 Tail Code: Triangle-S
 66th Bombardment Squadron
 67th Bombardment Squadron
 68th Bombardment Squadron
 Replaced by B-47 Stratojet in 1953

 55th Strategic Reconnaissance Wing, (B/RB-29, 1951)
 Activated in June 1948
 Forbes AFB, Kansas
 Tail Code: Square-V
 38th Strategic Reconnaissance Squadron
 338th Strategic Reconnaissance Squadron
 343d Strategic Reconnaissance Squadron
 Replaced by RB-50 Superfortress in 1951

 68th Bombardment Wing, (B-29, 1952–1953)
 Activated in October 1951
 Lake Charles AFB, Louisiana
 Tail Code: Unknown
 27th Bombardment Squadron
 51st Bombardment Squadron
 52d Bombardment Squadron
 Replaced by B-47 Stratojet in 1953

 90th Bombardment Wing, (B-29, 1951–1954; RB-29, 1951–1954; TB-29, 1951–1952)
 Activated in January 1951
 Fairchild AFB, Washington
 Tail Code: Circle-Z
 319th Bombardment Squadron
 320th Bombardment Squadron
 321st Bombardment Squadron
 Replaced by RB-47 Stratojet in 1954

 91st Strategic Reconnaissance Wing, (B-29, 1948–1949; RB-29, 1948–1951; TB-29, 1948–1949; TRB-29, 1949)
 Activated in October 1948
 McGuire AFB, New Jersey; Barksdale AFB, Louisiana, Lockbourne AFB, Ohio
 Tail Code: Square-I
 322d Strategic Reconnaissance Squadron
 323d Strategic Reconnaissance Squadron
 324th Strategic Reconnaissance Squadron
 91st Air Refueling Squadron, (KB-29, 1950–1953)
 Replaced by RB-50 Superfortress in 1951

 301st Bombardment Wing, (B-29, 1951–1953)
 Activated in November 1947
 Barksdale AFB, Louisiana
 Tail Code: Square-A
 32d Bombardment Squadron
 352d Bombardment Squadron
 353d Bombardment Squadron
 301st Air Refueling Squadron (KB-29, 1949–1953)
 Replaced by B-47 Stratojet in 1953

 303d Bombardment Wing, (B-29, 1951–1953)
 Activated in September 1951
 Davis-Monthan AFB, Arizona
 Tail Code: Square-A
 358th Bombardment Squadron
 359th Bombardment Squadron
 360th Bombardment Squadron
 9th Air Refueling Squadron (KB-29, 1952–1953)
 Replaced by B-47 Stratojet in 1953

 305th Bombardment Wing, (B-29, 1951–1953)
 Activated in January 1951
 MacDill AFB, Florida
 Tail Code: Unknown
 364th Bombardment Squadron
 365th Bombardment Squadron
 366th Bombardment Squadron
 Replaced by B-47 Stratojet in 1952

 310th Bombardment Wing, (B-29, 1952–1954)
 Activated in March 1952
 Forbes AFB, Kansas; Shilling AFB, Kansas
 Tail Code: Unknown
 379th Bombardment Squadron
 380th Bombardment Squadron
 381st Bombardment Squadron
 Replaced by B-47 Stratojet in 1954

 320th Bombardment Wing, (B-29, 1952–1953)
 Activated in December 1952
 March AFB, California
 Tail Code: Circle-A
 441st Bombardment Squadron
 442d Bombardment Squadron
 443d Bombardment Squadron
 444th Bombardment Squadron
 Replaced by B-47 Stratojet in 1953

 376th Bombardment Wing, (B-29, 1951–1954)
 Activated in May 1951
 Forbes AFB, Kansas; Barksdale AFB, Louisiana
 Tail Code: Unknown
 512th Bombardment Squadron
 513th Bombardment Squadron
 514th Bombardment Squadron
 Replaced by B-47 Stratojet in 1954

 506th Strategic Fighter Wing
 Dow AFB, Maine
 506th Air Refueling Squadron (KB-29, 1954–1955)

Tactical Air Command
After the Korean War and the phaseout of the B-29/KB-29 from SAC, KB-29s were acquired by Tactical Air Command to serve as dedicated aerial refueling tankers for Tactical Fighter aircraft to give TAC a worldwide deployment capability separate from SAC.  However, it was found that the KB-29 was totally unsuitable for the refuelling of jet fighters because they were too slow.   The KB-29s were replaced beginning in 1956 with faster KB-50s.

 420th Air Refueling Squadron, (KB-29M, 1954–1955) (USAFE)
 421st Air Refueling Squadron, (KB-29M, 1954–1955) (PACAF)
 427th Air Refueling Squadron, (KB-29M, 1956–1959)
 429th Air Refueling Squadron, (KB-29M, 1954–1958)
 431st Air Refueling Squadron, (KB-29M, 1957)
 622d Air Refueling Squadron, (KB-29M, 1955–1957)

Air Resupply And Communications Service
During the Cold War,  the Military Air Transport Service the controlling command for Air Commando units which performed special operations during the 1950s, including during the Korean War.   As part of the equipment used by the Air Resupply And Communications Service (ARCS) were B-29s modified for special operations missions.

 580th Air Resupply and Communications Wing, (B-29, 1951–1956)
 581st Air Resupply and Communications Wing, (B-29, 1951–1956)
 582nd Air Resupply and Communications Wing, (B-29, 1952–1956)

Air Weather Service
Air Weather Service (part of  Military Air Transport Service) received their first B-29s in various versions (B-29, RB-29, TB-29, WB-29) in 1946  AWS initially used B-29s in support of the 1946 Operation Crossroads atomic bomb tests at Bikini Atoll.

Weather reconnaissance duties required special variant of the B-29. Armament and related equipment was removed and in place of upper forward turret astrodome was installed. Additional radio and specialized meteorological equipment was installed and such refitted aircraft was redesignated WB-29.  While the B-29's "public" mission was that of weather reconnaissance, the "covert" mission, that of atmospheric sampling for radiation debris, was perhaps the more critical task.

WB-29s soldiered on through the mid-1950s, providing critical data on tropical storms, nuclear tests, and many other routine but important reconnaissance tasks. But the airplanes were weary, and by 1956 were replaced by a modification of seventy-eight B-50Ds to WB-50 configuration.

 53d Reconnaissance Squadron (Very Long Range, Weather)
 Kindley AFB, Bermuda (B-29, 1946–1947. WB-29, 1951–1956)
 54th Reconnaissance Squadron (Very Long Range, Weather)
 Andersen AFB, Guam (B-29, 1946–1947. WB-29, 1951–1956)
 55th Reconnaissance Squadron (Very Long Range, Weather)
 Fairfield-Suisun AFB, (later McClellan AFB), California (B-29, 1946–1947. TB-29/WB-29, 1951–1955)
 56th Reconnaissance Squadron (Very Long Range, Weather)
 Yokota AB, Japan (WB-29, 1951–1957)
 57th Reconnaissance Squadron (Very Long Range, Weather)
 Hickam AFB, Hawaii Territory (WB-29, 1951–1956)

 58th Reconnaissance Squadron (Very Long Range, Weather)
 Eielson AFB, Alaska Territory (WB-29, 1951–1956)
 59th Reconnaissance Squadron (Very Long Range, Weather)
 Ladd AFB. Alaska Territory (B-29, 1946–1947. WB-29, 1955–1956)
 512th Reconnaissance Squadron (Very Long Range, Weather)* (B-29, 1949–1954 RB-29/WB-29, 1949–1951)
 513th Reconnaissance Squadron (Very Long Range, Weather)* (B-29, 1951–1954 RB-29/WB-29, 1950–1951)
 514th Reconnaissance Squadron (Very Long Range, Weather)* (B-29, 1951–1954 TB-29/RB-29/WB-29, 1947–1951)
 1st Weather Reconnaissance Squadron (Special) (later 2078th Weather Reconnaissance Squadron)& (WB-29, 1948–1950)

NOTE: *Under operational control of Far East Air Forces flying combat weather reconnaissance missions over North Korea during the Korean War

Weapons Systems Development and Testing

 Air Technical Service Command/Air Materiel Command/Air Research and Development Command, Muroc AAF/AFB (later Edwards AFB), California
 Air Proving Ground Command, Eglin AFB, Florida

B-29-96-BW serial number 45-21800 was used as the "mother" aircraft for launches of the Bell X-1 rocket-powered research aircraft at Edwards AFB. On October 14, 1947, Capt Charles E. "Chuck" Yeager was dropped in his X-1 from the B-29 and was credited as the first human to pilot an aircraft faster than the speed of sound.

Several B-29s were modified for various experimental purposes under the designation EB-29. Perhaps the best known of these was the EB-29 used as the carrier aircraft for the McDonnell XF-85 Goblin parasite fighter in 1948. The rear bomb bay was modified to carry a special cradle from which the XF-85 could be launched and retrieved in flight.

Other B-29s flown at Eglin/Muroc/Edwards AFB were XB-29E fire control test model; XG-29G (44-84043) which served as a flying test bed for J-35, J-47 and J-73 jet engines mounted in the bomb bay; the YB-29H used for special armament testing; YB-29J used for services testing of improved engine designs; QB-29 target drones.  The CB-29K was an experimental transport version.

Air Defense Command
Beginning in 1954, the 4754th Radar Evaluation Squadron, Air Defense Command operated B-29s from various bases in the United States  to provide ECM training and evaluation services to its radar site personnel.  The B-29s contained an assortment of RADAR jamming devices to provide the required training of personnel.

 4754th Radar Evaluation Electronics Counter-Countermeasure Flight, Hamilton AFB, California
 4677th Radar Evaluation Electronics Counter-Countermeasure Flight, Hill AFB, Utah
 4713th Radar Evaluation Flight, Griffiss AFB, New York
 6023d Radar Evaluation Squadron, Naha AB, Okinawa (attached to Pacific Air Forces)

The last B-29 (a TB-29 radar evaluation aircraft, B-29-15-MO serial number 42-65234) was retired from the USAF inventory at 2010 hours on June 21, 1960, when Major Clarence C. Rarick of the 6023d Radar Evaluation Squadron landed at Naha Air Base, Okinawa, bringing the era of B-29 Superfortress military service to an end.

United States Navy

The United States Navy received four B-29s on April 14, 1947 and redesignated as P2B. Two of these aircraft were in standard configuration (P2B-1S), two another were equipped with test radar and additional fuel tank in bomb bay (P2B-2S).

 P2B-1S BuNo 84028 (B-29-95-BW 45-21789)
 P2B-1S BuNo 84029 (B-29-95-BW 45-21787)
 P2B-2S BuNo 84030 (B-29-95-BW 45-21791)
 P2B-2S BuNo 84031 (B-29-90-BW 44-87766)

Naval B-29s were used as test beds and as mother ships in various programs. One P2B-1S was extensively modified to carry the Douglas D-558-II Skyrocket supersonic rocket-powered research aircraft. The first Skyrocket launch took place on September 8, 1950. The Skyrocket exceeded Mach 2 for the first time on November 20, 1953 (piloted by Scott Crossfield). The last Skyrocket flight took place in December 1956.

P2B-1S BuNo 84029 was later transferred to NACA for continuation of high-speed flight tests and was redesignated as NACA-137.  It was eventually sold to a civilian owner, a museum in Oakland, California. This was the only example of a flyable B-29 ever being sold to a civilian operator. This B-29 was flown on rare occasions under the civil registration N91329. After many years of inactivity, it was sold to the Kermit Weeks Aviation Museum of Miami, Florida. It was transported there disassembled in 1987. It was registered with the Weeks Museum as N29KW.

Allied nations

United Kingdom
During the early 1950s, the Royal Air Force urgently needed interim aircraft for its bomber units, as a "stop gap" replacement for the Avro Lincoln, until British-designed and manufactured jets like the English Electric Canberra and, in the longer term, the so-called "V bombers", became operational. From the RAF's point of view the B-29, was a heavy bomber comparable to the Lincoln, albeit with distinct performance and capacity advantages and, as a type that had already been proven operationally, did not detract from the development of the British jets.

A formal agreement with the USA was signed on January 27, 1950 and the USAF loaned the RAF seventy B-29 bombers which received the serials WF434-WF448, WF490-WF-514 and WF545-WF574. Later another 18 were delivered under serials WW342-WW356 and WZ966-WZ968. The aircraft received the service name Boeing Washington B.1 (B.1 from "Bomber Mark 1") with RAF Bomber Command from 1950 as a longer-range nuclear-capable bomber, pending the introduction of the English Electric Canberra in quantity.

Most of the airframes were taken out of USAF storage and were virtually new, having been delivered at the end of the Pacific War, although a small number came from operational units. The first 4 aircraft were delivered to the Washington Conversion Unit at RAF Marham on March 22, 1950. All B-29s for the RAF were ferried by the crews of the 307th Bombardment Wing USAF. The first unit converted to Washingtons was No. 115 Squadron RAF which flown from USA in June 1950.  Two RAF Washingtons took part in the Laurence Minot SAC bombing competition in 1951 alongside USAF B-29s.

Squadrons based at RAF Coningsby were converted to English Electric Canberra bombers in 1953. Squadrons from RAF Marham were converted a year later. Most Washingtons were returned to the United States, being flown by RAF crews to Dover AFB; then subsequently to the aircraft storage facility at Davis-Monthan AFB.  A small number of Washingtons remained in the United Kingdom, being used by 192 Sq. for Electronic Intelligence operations until 1958; later being used as ground target airframes for RAF combat aircraft.

Royal Air Force
RAF Marham
 No. 35 Squadron RAF
 No. 90 Squadron RAF
 No. 115 Squadron RAF
 No. 207 Squadron RAF

RAF Coningsby
 No. 15 Squadron RAF
 No. 44 Squadron RAF
 No. 57 Squadron RAF (moved from RAF Waddington in April 1952)
 No. 149 Squadron RAF

RAF Watton
 No. 192 Squadron RAF operated Washingtons between April 1952 and February 1958.

Australia
Two ex-RAF Washingtons (WW354 and WW353) (former USAAF 44-61963; 44-62049) were turned over by the RAF to the Royal Australian Air Force Aeronautical Research and Development Unit in late 1952 and conducted trials for the United Kingdom's Ministry of Supply.  They were assigned the RAAF serials A76-1 and A76-2.  Both aircraft were retired in 1956 and sold for scrap in 1957.

Royal Australian Air Force
Aeronautical Research and Development Unit

See also

 Boeing 377
 Tupolev Tu-4

References

Notes

Bibliography
 Birdsall, Steve. B-29 Superfortress in Action (Aircraft in Action 31). Carrollton, Texas: Squadron/Signal Publications, Inc., 1977. .
 Davis, Larry. B-29 Superfortress in Action (Aircraft in Action 165). Carrollton, Texas: Squadron/Signal Publications, 1997. .
 Dorr, Robert F. B-29 Superfortress Units in World War Two (Combat Aircraft 33). Botley, Oxford, UK: Osprey Publishing, 2002. .
 Fopp, Michael A. The Washington File. Tonbridge, kent, UK: Air-Britain (Historians) Ltd., 1983.
 Lloyd, Alwyn T. B-29 Superfortress. Part 1. Production Versions (Detail & Scale 10). Fallbrook, CA/London: Aero Publishers/Arms & Armour Press, Ltd., 1983.  (USA).  (UK).
 Lloyd, Alwyn T. B-29 Superfortress. Part 2. Derivatives (Detail & Scale 25). Blue Ridge Summit, PA/London: TAB Books/Arms & Armour Press, Ltd., 1987.  (USA).  (UK).
 Mayborn, Mitch. The Boeing B-29 Superfortress (aircraft in Profile 101). Windsor, Berkshire, UK: Profile Publications Ltd., 1971 (reprint).
 Nowicki, Jacek. B-29 Superfortress (Monografie Lotnicze 13) (in Polish). Gdańsk, Poland: AJ-Press, 1994. .
 Pimlott, John. 'B-29 Superfortress. London: Bison Books Ltd., 1980. .
 Rigmant, Vladimir. B-29, Tу-4 - стратегические близнецы - как это было (Авиация и космонавтика 17 (Крылья 4))''. Moscow, Russia, 1996.

Lists of military units and formations of World War II
B-29 Superfortress
Operators